The Pied-du-Courant Prison is a prison museum in Montreal, Quebec, Canada near the Saint Lawrence River and the Jacques-Cartier Bridge.

Overview 

The original plan for a prison in Montreal was designed by Quebec architect George Blaiklock in 1825 to replace the prison at Champ de Mars (built in the first decade of the 19th Century), but John Wells ultimately designed the building (after a prison in Philadelphia, likely the Eastern State Penitentiary built in 1829) that was finally opened a decade later. The building was built to house over 276 prisoners, but held over 1500 prisoners from the 1837-1838 rebellion. The prison operated from 1836 to 1912 as a city prison in Montreal and housed prisoners and hangings following the Lower Canada Rebellion in 1838.

The prison was replaced by Bordeaux Prison and was vacant from 1912 to 1921. In 1921 it was acquired by and became the headquarters of the Société des alcools du Québec, the provincial-owned liquor board in Quebec.

The main prison building was altered with the Gable roof on the front of centre block removed, a fourth floor added (replacing roofing) and new wing added to the rear (by SAQ). The west wall in the front was demolished leaving the gate and east wall intact.

It saw the incarceration and execution by hanging of several Patriotes who had fought the Lower Canada Rebellion. Because of this, it also houses a museum on the history of the Patriotes and a gathering is usually held there on National Patriote Day. Upon the front of its site is found the Monument aux Patriotes by sculptor Alfred Laliberté. The whole of Pierre Falardeau's film February 15, 1839 happens at the Prison.

Monument aux Patriotes 
The monument is located in the Place of the Patriots, which is in front of the Société des alcools du Québec offices and the site of the old Pied-du-Courant Prison.

The work of Alfred Laliberté, the Monument aux Patriotes was unveiled on June 24, 1926. On each its three faces a carved bronze medallion represents patriots Chevalier de Lorimier, Louis-Joseph Papineau, and Wolfred Nelson.

Executions 
December 21, 1838
Joseph-Narcisse Cardinal
Joseph Duquet
January 18, 1839
Pierre-Théophile Decoigne
François-Xavier Hamelin
Joseph-Jacques Robert
Ambroise Sanguinet
Charles Sanguinet
February 15, 1839
Amable Daunais
François-Marie-Thomas Chevalier de Lorimier
Charles Hindelang
Pierre-Rémi Narbonne
François Nicolas
December 9, 1881
Hugh Hayvren
April 16, 1883
Timothy Milloy
December 13, 1901
J.-E. Laplaine
June 13, 1902
Thorval Hansen or Hancon
November 19, 1909
John Dillon A.K.A. J. Smith
November 10, 1910
Timothy Candy
May 26, 1911
F. Grivora or Grevola

Notable inmates 

 Félix Poutré

See also 
Patriote movement
Quebec nationalism
Quebec independence movement
History of Quebec
Timeline of Quebec history

Gallery

References

External links
 

Defunct prisons in Canada
Museums in Montreal
Lower Canada Rebellion
Prisons in Quebec
Prison museums in Canada
Centre-Sud
Headquarters in Canada
Government buildings completed in 1835
1926 sculptures
1836 establishments in Lower Canada
Heritage buildings of Quebec
John Wells (architect) buildings
Government buildings in Montreal